Volkswagen Truck & Bus Indústria e Comércio de Veículos Ltda. (formerly known as Volkswagen Caminhões e Ônibus), is a Brazilian commercial vehicle manufacturing company based in Resende, Brazil and a subsidiary of Traton. It manufactures heavy trucks and buses under the Volkswagen marque.

Volkswagen Caminhões e Ônibus was originally a part of the Volkswagen Commercial Vehicles division of the Volkswagen Group. On 1 January 2009, it was sold to MAN SE, and formed its MAN Latin America division. In August 2021, MAN SE was merged with Traton SE, with the latter becoming the direct owner and parent of Volkswagen Truck and Bus.

Volkswagen Caminhões e Ônibus operation
In 1979, Volkswagenwerk AG acquired a 67% percent stake in Chrysler Motors do Brasil Ltda (:pt).  In January 1980, it increased its shareholding to 100%, therefore giving it the right to rename the company to Volkswagen Caminhões Ltda.

Volkswagen Caminhões Ltda. released their first trucks in February/March 1981; the Volkswagen 11.130 and the Volkswagen 13.130, both had a reworked version of Volkswagen's Mk1 LT cabin, and were powered by MWM Motores Diesel Ltda (MWM) diesel engines on Chrysler engineered platforms which were inherited from the takeover.

AutoLatina years
From 1987 to 1996, Volkswagen Trucks and Buses were built with Ford components as part of the AutoLatina venture, and were built in Ford's Ipiranga complex in Brazil.

Once the AutoLatina marriage fell through, Volkswagen Group had no factory for its trucks and their parts, so the Resende plant was built in 1995.

Resende rebirth

1996, Resende was the official start for Volkswagen Trucks and Buses, developing their own parts and platforms.  The Modular Consortium was introduced for the first time in Resende.

Modular Consortium
The Modular Consortium is the group of main suppliers that make the parts, and assembles them for Volkswagen Truck and Bus on site in the Resende factory.

Volkswagen Groups involvement is only in supplying the factory and inspection at the end of production; Volkswagen pays only a small amount of wages, as each partner of the Modular Consortium pays the workers.

The Modular Consortium comprises these companies:
Maxion Sistemas Automotivos Ltda. manufacture the chassis parts such as Air Reservoir, Fuel Tank and Frame
ArvinMeritor manufacture the Suspension and Axle parts such as Springs and Hubs and Drums
Remon S.A. manufacture the Tires and Wheels
Aethra Resende manages the Body Shop
PowerTrain manages the engine preparation and assembly
Carese manages the Paint Shop
Kromberg and Schubert (usually referred to as KROSCHU) manufactures the Cab Trim components such as Seats and Instrument Panel

Sales
Most of the early sales of the Truck and Bus chassis' operations were mainly within South America; with the exception of small exportations to China and the Middle East.

Prior to Volkswagen Commercial Vehicles' new role of managing the Truck and Bus operation; in 1994 Volkswagen imported to Germany a 7 tonne truck: the Volkswagen L80.  Due to the European Union Gas Emissions EU4 standards; exports discontinued in late 2000.

The Volkswagen Commercial Vehicles era
Volkswagen Commercial Vehicles took over the Brazilian Trucks and Buses operation in 2000 from Volkswagen do Brasil; Volkswagen's Brazilian subsidiary.  This signaled the start of a new era for the Volkswagen Group in producing its own Heavy Truck and Bus chassis range, which covers the gross combination mass (GCM) of 5 tonnes to 57 tonnes category.

Since Volkswagen Commercial Vehicles have taken control; the company has been looking at expanding Truck and Bus sales to other markets outside of South America, South Africa and Middle East regions.

All Volkswagen Caminhões e Ônibus vehicles are built in the Resende, Brazil factory and sent in semi knocked down (SKD) kits to Uitenhage in South Africa and Puebla in Mexico.

Planned future markets for export are ASEAN and Eastern Europe countries.

Volkswagen Caminhões e Ônibus released the new Volkswagen Constellation range in September 2005, with a gross combination mass from 13 tonnes to 57 tonnes.

Volkswagen Caminhões e Ônibus company facts
The Resende plant was built in 153 days at a cost of US$250 million
The Resende plant adheres to International Organization for Standardization ISO TS and ISO 14001
Resende plant produces 240 vehicles per day in two working shifts and employs 4,500 workers.
Volkswagen Trucks and Buses are sold in over 35 countries around the world.  Some of the countries are Argentina, Peru, Chile, Uruguay, Bolivia, Colombia, Venezuela, Paraguay, Ecuador, Dominican Republic, Côte d'Ivoire, Nigeria and Saudi Arabia.
Most of the Volkswagen truck and Bus growth has been in the last eight years
All the 2007 Volkswagen truck range are capable of operating in minus 20 °C and plus 45 °C; Middle East specified trucks can stand 55 degrees Celsius.
Volkswagen Caminhões e Ônibus are assembled at the MAN Automotive Concessionaires Corporation plant in Quezon City, Philippines since March 2014.

BMB Mode Center
Established in 2002 10 km from Resende the assembly plant, the BMB Mode Center is responsible for modifications to the truck and bus range that cannot be done on the production line.

BMB Mode Center build:
For bus range: low entry buses and articulated buses.
For truck range: 4x4, 8x4 & 8x2 conversions as well as an armored truck & finally exterior design modifications.

The BMB division moved in June 2006 to the new location 150 m outside the Resende Plant.  The new location has 30,000 square metres of land; it cost Brazilian R$7 million to build.

Volkswagen Caminhões e Ônibus highlights

1980s
January 1981 Volkswagenwerk AG acquires 100% of the Chrysler Motors of Brazil Ltda
February 1981 Volkswagen Caminhões Ltda releases first trucks — 11.130, 13.130, and an ethanol powered truck
March 1981 Changing of name from Chrysler Motors of Brazil Ltda to Volkswagen Caminhões Ltda (Caminhões is Portuguese for trucks)
September 1982 Launching of 6 tonne truck range
July 1984 Integration of Volkswagen Caminhões Ltda. into Volkswagen do Brasil
August 1984 Volkswagen 140, the first methane gas/biogas powered truck in Brazil
July 1985 Volkswagen 11.130 exported to China
July 1987 Truck division integrates with Ford Trucks with the formation of AutoLatina

1990s
July 1990 Volkswagen Caminhões e Ônibus plant moves to Industrial Complex of the Ipiranga
April 1993 Launching of the first Volkswagen Volksbus chassis 16.180 CO
April 1994 Volkswagen Caminhões e Ônibus celebrate 100,000th VWCV truck produced
June 1995
 Beginning of the Volkswagen L80 exports to Germany
 Volkswagen Caminhões Ltda. announces Resende, Brazil as site for the construction of the future Truck and Bus plant
November 1996 Volkswagen Caminhões Ltda moves to new Resende plant
September 1997 Commemoration of the 5000th vehicle made in the Resende plant
June 1998
 Launching of the Volkswagen Trucks for the Argentine market
 Export of complete knock down (CKD) kits of Volksbus microbus chassis to Colombia

2000s
January 2000 Volkswagen Commercial Vehicles (VWN) of Germany, with headquarters in Hanover, assumes the responsibility for the Truck and Bus operation
March 2000 Launching of Series 2000
April 2001 For the first time in its 20 years, the Volkswagen Caminhões Ltda becomes leader in the Brazilian market for trucks
August 2002 Volkswagen Caminhões e Ônibus has 30% market share of Brazilian market, Brazil is the Number 1 in the world, buyer of Buses and Number 2 for Trucks
December 2002 Production of 100,000th Volkswagen truck in Resende
July 2003 Volkswagen Caminhões e Ônibus participates in the International Rally of the Sertões, with three 8.150 trucks
October 2003 Announcement of the creation of Volkswagen Truck and Bus Operation in Mexico, construction of an assembly line starts in the City of Puebla, Mexico
November 2003 In pioneering research in Brazil, Volkswagen tests a Volksbus powered by biodiesel with the support of the Government of the State of Rio de Janeiro and the UFRJ, in the Riobiodiesel project
April 2004 Volkswagen 18.310 successful for the first time in the Super European Truck Championship
July 2004 Volkswagen Caminhões e Ônibus add three more vehicles in the RioBiodiesel programme
August 2004 First Volkswagen truck production tests are conducted in the plant of Puebla, Mexico
September 2004 Volkswagen announces construction of plant for Volkswagen Truck and Bus range in Port Elizabeth, South Africa
October 2004
 The Puebla, Mexican Volkswagen plant officially opens
 Volkswagen Titan 18.310 is champion in the Super European Truck Championships in the first year it competes
October 2005 Beginning of the Volkswagen Truck and Bus operation in South Africa with the production of three Volksbus models
November 2005 Volkswagen Truck and Bus release Delivery (5 to 8 tonnes) and Constellation (13 to 45 tonnes) lines
June 2006
 The BMB Mode Centre is opened for specialised modification of Volkswagen Caminhões e Ônibus range
 The Constellation Daycab is released
September 2006 The top-of-the-line 18.320 VIP Volksbus is released
February 2007 Release of the 31.320 6x4 Constellation, and 15.190, 17.230 Volksbus line
8 August 2007 Volkswagen Caminhões e Ônibus released their most powerful diesel engine – the Volkswagen NGD 370 in the Volkswagen Constellation lineup
22 August 2007 Volkswagen produce the first right hand drive heavy truck in the companies history, with the release of the Volkswagen Constellation range in South Africa
8 August 2008 Volkswagen releases a new robotised transmission in co-operation with ZF Friedrichshafen AG for the Volksbus range
15 December 2008 Volkswagen AG sells Volkswagen Caminhões e Ônibus to MAN SE to form MAN Latin America.

2010s
3 November 2011 Volkswagen AG acquires majority share holding of 55.9% in MAN SE, thus officially bringing Volkswagen Caminhões e Ônibus back into the Volkswagen Group.
13 September 2017 Volkswagen Caminhões e Ônibus launches an all new generation of the popular Volkswagen Delivery family.

2020s
1 September 2020 Volkswagen Caminhões e Ônibus launches their first heavy duty flagship model, the Volkswagen Meteor.
31 August 2021 MAN SE is merged with Traton SE, with the latter becoming the new owner and parent of Volkswagen Caminhões e Ônibus
18 May 2022 Volkswagen Caminhões e Ônibus announced it was changing its corporate name to Volkswagen Truck & Bus, one of its parent's former names.

Volkswagen Caminhões e Ônibus in motorsports

Volkswagen Caminhões e Ônibus competes in the Brazilian Fórmula Truck championship, with four drivers.  The Volkswagen Constellation 18.310 Titan tractor unit is used; they are driven by Renato Martins, Felipe Giaffone, Walmir Benavides and Débora Rodrigues.  Furthermore, an additional Constellation is used as the official pace truck, driven by Ana Lúcia Lopes.

Current models
 Volkswagen Meteor
 Volkswagen Constellation
 Volkswagen Delivery
 Volkswagen Volksbus

Volkswagen Caminhões e Ônibus gallery

References

External links
official sites
MAN Latin America international portal  
Volkswagen Trucks and Buses Nigeria official website
Volkswagen Brazil Truck and Bus  official website
MAN Volkswagen Truck and Bus Brazil press site 
Resende (Brazil) Plant Sustainability site 
BMB Mode Center (VW Trucks and Buses modification branch) 
Volkswagen Heavy Trucks in Mexico 
unaffiliated sites
South African Constellation and Volksbus specifications
Volkswagen Trucks in Colombia

1981 establishments in Brazil
Traton
Brazilian subsidiaries of foreign companies
Bus manufacturers of Brazil
Truck manufacturers of Brazil
Defence companies of Brazil
Companies based in Rio de Janeiro (state)
Vehicle manufacturing companies established in 1981